C. polyclada may refer to:

 Calceolaria polyclada, a lady's purse
 Canna polyclada, a garden plant
 Crataegus polyclada, a hawthorn native to eastern North America
 Cryptandra polyclada, a buckthorn shrub